The 2018–19 Scottish Junior Cup was the 133rd season of the Scottish Junior Cup, the national knockout tournament for member clubs of the Scottish Junior Football Association (SJFA). The competition was sponsored by Macron in the first year of a three-year deal and is known as the Macron Scottish Junior Cup.

A total of 129 clubs entered the competition, which was 28 fewer than the previous season. This was due to 25 teams leaving the Junior ranks for the East of Scotland League along with Cruden Bay, Inverness City, and Lewis United not entering the tournament.

Auchinleck Talbot were the defending champions. They successfully defended their title with a 2–0 win over Largs Thistle in the final.

Calendar
The dates for each round of the 2018–19 tournament are as follows:

Drawn matches are replayed and replays that end in a draw proceed direct to a penalty shootout, there is no extra time. Semi-finals are played home and away over two legs with the winner on aggregate progressing to the final. If the aggregate score is tied at the end of the second leg, the match will also proceed direct to a penalty shootout.

First round
The four Junior clubs competing in the Scottish Cup were not included in the draw for the first round:
 Auchinleck Talbot - Junior Cup holders
 Beith Juniors - West of Scotland Super League Premier Division champions

Also qualified automatically for the second round were Banks O'Dee, who achieved national club licensing requirements, and Girvan, who qualify automatically as historic full members of the Scottish Football Association.

The first and second round draws took place at Hampden Park, Glasgow on 23 August 2018.

Second round

1 Tie awarded to Cumnock Juniors as Coupar Angus unable to raise side.
2 Tie played at Victoria Park, Newmains after Rosyth's Fleet Grounds deemed unsuitable to host match.
3 Tie played at Valefield Park, Kilbirnie after Gartcairn's MTC Park deemed unsuitable to host match.

Replays

Third round
The third round draw took place at the offices of the Scottish Sun newspaper in Glasgow on 9 October 2018.

4 Tie played at Petershill Park, Glasgow after Gartcairn's MTC Park deemed unsuitable to host match.

Replays

Fourth round

5Tie played at Stark's Park, Kirkcaldy.

Replays

Fifth round

Replays

Quarter-finals

Replay

Semi-finals
The draw for the semi finals took place on 7 March 2019.

First leg

Second leg

Largs Thistle won 4–3 on aggregate.

Auchinleck Talbot won 6–1 on aggregate.

Final
The Final of the Macron Scottish Junior Cup was played at New Douglas Park, Hamilton on Sunday 2 June with a 4.10pm kick off. The game was televised live by BBC Alba. Both teams wore their away strips.

References

2018–19 in Scottish football cups
Scottish Junior Cup seasons